The 2001 Lehigh Valley Grand Prix, known informally as the 2001 Nazareth 225, was a Championship Auto Racing Teams (CART) motor race held on May 6, 2001 at Nazareth Speedway in Nazareth, Pennsylvania, USA. It was the 4th round of the 2001 CART season. Rookie Scott Dixon won the race by just four tenths of a second over Kenny Bräck, while Paul Tracy took third.

Dixon scored his first and only CART win after he successfully gambled on a fuel-saving strategy that gave PacWest Racing its last win before the team folded in 2002 as well as its first win since 1997. Bräck's first podium of the season was the prelude to two consecutive wins at Motegi and Milwaukee, putting him solidly in the championship hunt. For Tracy, it was his second podium in three races, but he would not record another for the rest of the season.

The race was the first after the Firestone Firehawk 600 fiasco, and there were concerns about the G-Forces experienced at Nazareth that were ultimately unfounded. This would also be the last time that CART raced at the speedway, allowing open-wheel rival Indy Racing League to run its own 225-lap race from 2002-2004.

Report

Background
The race weekend began just days after the 600-mile event at Texas Motor Speedway scheduled for April 29 was postponed and ultimately canceled due to extreme g-forces experienced by the drivers that made race conditions critically dangerous. Speedway and CART officials were still discussing options over possible dates later in the year for a make-up race, but after announcing that all ticket holders would receive refunds without word of a replacement event, it became clear that any future for the series at Texas Motor Speedway was in serious doubt.

In the meantime, rumors spread that Nazareth Speedway would be cut from the 2002 schedule despite it being one of CART's longest-running events in an effort to reduce travel costs. On raceday itself, CART officials released a statement that the series would be reviewing its options after the race in Japan and make a decision then.

It was later decided that the series would not continue racing at Nazareth, dropping the venue, along with Belle Isle, Michigan, Lausitz, and Houston for the 2002 season.

Following driver complaints that the aerodynamic packages used at the track the year before had caused too much turbulence and reduced the amount of passing on-track, CART officials decided to use a low-downforce version of the Hanford device on the cars instead of the high-downforce version used previously at Nazareth. This configuration was normally used on intermediate-length ovals like the Milwaukee Mile and it was hoped that it would slow the cars down in the corners enough to encourage passing. It also meant that Patrick Carpentier's lap record from the previous year would remain untouched.

Another technical innovation was the introduction of the HANS Device, a restraint that reduced the amount of lateral head movement by the driver in the event of a crash. CART had made it mandatory for all drivers on oval courses at the beginning of the season, and the race at Nazareth would be the first professional open-wheel race where all drivers would be required to use it.

PacWest driver Maurício Gugelmin, after being involved in a major crash in Texas the week before, withdrew from the event at Nazareth following the death of his six-year-old son, who had cerebral palsy. Gugelmin had not missed a race since his CART debut at Mid-Ohio in 1993; his 130 consecutive race-streak had been the longest of all active drivers in the series. Because the news came on such short notice, PacWest Racing had no backup drivers available to fill in for Gugelmin, and so the NEXTEL sponsorship from his car was placed onto his teammate's, Scott Dixon, instead.

Practice and Qualifying 
Friday morning practice saw rookie Bruno Junqueira top the time sheets with a 20.485. Junqueira and Chip Ganassi teammate Nicolas Minassian had tested at the track the previous November and then again two weeks before the race as part of a CART rookie test. Penske's Helio Castroneves took second place approximately two tenths slower than Junqueira, while Kenny Bräck took third.

Friday afternoon practice saw much of the same, but the speeds increased as the afternoon sun heated the track. Junqueira remained on top overall with his morning session time despite many other drivers improving their speeds on the warm track. Max Papis showed great improvement from the morning session as he slotted into second place while Helio Castroneves fell back to third after failing to improve on his earlier time.

Saturday morning practice was ultimately ended early due to light showers, but not before Bräck broke the twenty second barrier and took the top spot overall with a 19.926. Castroneves was the only other driver to go sub-twenty seconds with a 19.979 in the session. Junqueira improved his time by going 20.090, third overall.

Qualifying was delayed by just under ten minutes to allow the track crews to finish drying the track after the showers that stopped morning practice finally ended. Early in the session, Papis spun going into Turn 4, bringing out the yellow flag. He was able to get the car back into pit lane and retry his qualifying lap after everyone else had completed theirs.

Nicolas Minassian, meanwhile, was not as lucky. Halfway through the session, he lost control through Turn 2 and slammed into the outside wall, rupturing an oil line and sending the car up in flames. Minassian was able to exit the car under his own power and was soon released from the infield medical center. The car, however, was written off, forcing Minassian to use a backup and start the race from last place.

At the end of qualifying, Junqueira was able to push his #4 Toyota-powered Lola to pole position with a 19.700, his first pole position in the series and the first by a rookie since Alex Tagliani in Rio de Janeiro the previous year. This was also the third consecutive pole for Chip Ganassi Racing at Nazareth, following Juan Pablo Montoya in 1999 and 2000. Bräck kept up his practice pace by starting second alongside Junqueira with a 19.738, his fourth consecutive front-row start of the season (Bräck had qualified first at the previous event in Texas, but the race was canceled the following day). Michel Jourdain Jr. qualified a career-best third, two and a half tenths behind the pole. Only four drivers were able to break the 20 second barrier in qualifying. Defending race winner and reigning CART champion Gil de Ferran could only muster 15th while teammate and previous race winner Castroneves would start 5th. Points leader Cristiano da Matta qualified 9th.

Race 
On raceday itself, Bräck was fastest in the morning warmup, and the rain that complicated practice the day before had given way to clear skies.

When the green flag waved later that afternoon, Bräck immediately jumped into the lead heading into Turn 1. Bryan Herta, who had qualified a respectable 7th, spun after the start-finish line, forcing the first caution. Sliding down the track, he managed to keep it off the inside wall just past pit exit, but stalled the car. Other than flat-spotting his tires, Herta suffered minor wing damage but he got his car restarted and was able to continue. The damage forced him to pit, however, and he was now a lap down.

On Lap 4, just as the field was approaching the green flag, Castroneves spun going into Turn 4, but he kept the car under control and on the track. The incident, however, meant that he fell from 5th to 11th as the caution flag waved again. In the meantime, Oriol Servià streaked past Junqueira to take second place.

Scott Dixon and Herta used the caution period to top off on fuel as they were both already at the back, precipitating the first of multiple race strategies that day.

The cars returned to the green flag single-file on Lap 10, Bräck still leading with Servià second. The cars continued with little on-track action with the exception of Patrick Carpentier's engine letting go on Lap 28, forcing him to retire. It was his third DNF in as many races. By Lap 40, Bräck had already begun lapping the field.

On Lap 74, 4th-place Jourdain spun coming out of Turn 4 while passing the lapped car of Alex Zanardi. He got the car under control in the infield and got it back on the track, but the caution still came out as a result of the incident.

The caution provided a wonderful opportunity for the leaders to pit, and on Lap 76 the majority of the field came in for their first pit stop of the race. Junqueira overshot his pit box, resulting in a lengthy pit stop which dropped him back to 11th. Cristiano da Matta's quick stop vaulted him into 3rd place behind Bräck and Servià. Max Papis, meanwhile, retired from the race with a gearbox malfunction.

The green flag waved again on Lap 82, and once again Bräck took off from the rest of the field. da Matta was able to stay hooked up with Servià and fight for 2nd position while leaving 4th place Adrian Fernández behind. Castroneves had managed to climb back up to 5th after his earlier spin while his teammate de Ferran was having a miserable day, falling back from 15th to 19th, the last car on the lead lap, as a result of a poor-handling car and a stall in the pitlane. Within twenty laps, Bräck had already reached the tail end of the field and was beginning to close in on de Ferran.

The stretch of green-flag racing came to an end on Lap 113 when Tora Takagi, running in 15th place, spun coming out of Turn 4, bringing out the caution for the fourth time. He managed the keep the car off the wall and resumed without stopping.

The fuel strategies continued to diversify on Lap 116 as Jimmy Vasser, Paul Tracy, Junqueira, Dixon, and nine other drivers pitted for tires and fuel while the front-runners stayed on track.

The green waved on Lap 119, but scarcely a lap had gone by before the yellow came back out when de Ferran and Tagliani's cars collided going into Turn 3, putting both out of the race and ending a dismal weekend for the reigning champion. de Ferran was able to climb out of the car unhurt, but it took several laps to extricate Tagliani from his car; it was later determined that he had soreness and pain in his back as a result of the crash, but he would return at the next race at Motegi.

The top four drivers of Bräck, Servià, da Matta, and Fernández used the caution period to stop for tires and fuel on Lap 124, as did Castroneves and Michael Andretti. Bräck slotted into 10th place while Tony Kanaan inherited the lead behind the safety car. Kanaan, 2nd place Dario Franchitti, and 3rd place Shinji Nakano had all last pitted on Lap 76, while Tracy, Dixon, Vasser, Christian Fittipaldi, Jourdain, and Junqueira made up positions 4-9, having pit on Lap 116. At this point in the race, the first three cars would be forced to pit for fuel before the checkered flag, positions 4-9 would have to rely on fuel-saving measures and hope for more caution laps to safely make it to the end without stopping, while 10th place Bräck and the cars behind him had enough to fuel to complete the race.

Herta, now four laps behind the leader, retired the car in the pits on Lap 131; this would be the first of four consecutive retirements for the Forsythe driver. With the cars still under caution, Franchitti pulled into the pitlane on Lap 142 for his final stop, dropping him down the order from 2nd to 16th place.

The green finally came back out on Lap 144 with Kanaan leading. Bräck began climbing through the pack, jumping from 9th to 7th on the restart while Kanaan could not pull away from the rest of the field. Dixon was able to get around Tracy for 3rd place, while at the same time Bräck had passed Fittipaldi, Vasser, and Tracy by Lap 168 to pull into 4th behind him. Four laps later, Zanardi was given a step-and-go penalty for speeding on the pit lane.

On Lap 182, Nakano pitted from 2nd place for fuel and tires, but the quick lap times around the track meant that he would fall one lap down to 16th place. Just a few laps later, Fernández pulled into the pits from 12th to retire the car due to an electrical problem. Leader Kanaan finally relinquished the lead to Dixon on Lap 191 after running out of fuel on-track, forcing him to pit for fuel and tires, putting him a lap down in 17th place. The stop was not without incident, however: as Kanaan moved onto the apron on the back straightaway to enter the pits, he almost collided with 3rd place Bräck, who was trying to pass him on the inside. The near-collision forced Bräck to lift and allowed 1st place Dixon to open up a gap between them.

Despite dominating the first half of the race and carving his way through the field after the last yellow, Bräck was having difficulty keeping up with Dixon and he struggled to maintain pace as the laps wound down.

On Lap 215, Jourdain spun coming out of Turn 4, bringing out the final caution of the day. He kept it off the wall but dropped to 13th place, the last car on the lead lap.

The green waved again on Lap 219 with seven laps to go. Dixon tried to pull away from the field but Bräck refused to let him get away. It was still uncertain whether Dixon could make it the rest of the way without stopping for fuel, but Bräck could not challenge him. Despite a last-lap scare while trying to lap Jourdain, Dixon was able to hold off the dominant Team Rahal machine and take the win.

Post-Race 
By winning the race, Dixon became the youngest winner in professional open-wheel racing history at 20 years, 9 months, and 14 days old until the record was broken by Marco Andretti at the Indy Grand Prix of Sonoma in 2006; his performance here would be a deciding factor in his winning CART Rookie of the Year for the 2001 season. He also gave PacWest Racing its fifth and final win, the first since Mark Blundell at the 1997 Marlboro 500. The team would later fold just three races into the 2002 CART season. This would also prove to be Dixon's only CART series win, as he would join Chip Ganassi Racing for the 2003 Indy Racing League season, where he has remained ever since. He would go on to win five championships in the IndyCar series and score 43 race victories; his ability to conserve fuel would later become one of his most well-known traits as a racer.

Dixon had denied Kenny Bräck his first CART series win, and he would have to wait until the next race at Motegi before earning his first victory. Nevertheless, this was Bräck's first podium of the season, and he would go on to earn five more, including four wins.

Paul Tracy, who rounded out the podium, had taken his third Top-4 finish in a row and was now tied with da Matta for first place in the points standings. A string of crashes, bad luck, and mediocre finishes, though, destroyed his early-season form, and he ended up at the bottom of the standings at the end of the season.

Qualifying

Race

Notes
– Includes one bonus point for leading the most laps.
– Includes one bonus point for being the fastest qualifier.

Race statistics
Lead changes: 2 among 3 drivers

Standings after the race

Drivers' standings 

Constructors' standings

Manufacturer's Standings

References

Lehigh Valley Grand Prix, 2001